The 2012 Conference Premier play-off Final, known as the 2012 Blue Square Bet Premier play-off Final for sponsorship purposes, was a football match between Luton Town and York City on 20 May 2012 at Wembley Stadium in London. It was the tenth Conference Premier play-off Final and the first to be played at Wembley since 2010. York won the match 2–1, coming from behind after conceding to Luton in the second minute to secure promotion to League Two, re-entering the Football League after an eight-year absence.

Match

Details

References

Play-off Final 2012
2012
Play-off Final 2012
Play-off Final 2012
Conference Premier play-off Final
National League play-off final
Events at Wembley Stadium